Marie Carlsson (born 15 February 1958) is a Swedish rower. She competed in the women's double sculls event at the 1984 Summer Olympics.

References

External links
 

1958 births
Living people
Swedish female rowers
Olympic rowers of Sweden
Rowers at the 1984 Summer Olympics
Sportspeople from Gothenburg
20th-century Swedish women